This is a list of genera in the plant family Araceae.  As currently circumscribed, the family contains over 3700 species into approximately a hundred genera. The family's taxonomy remains in flux, and a full taxonomic treatment integrating the mass of phylogenetic data that has become available in the last 10 years remain to be produced. The classification presented here is informed by the review of Mayo et al. (2013).

Genera

Taxonomy

Bogner & Nicolson (1991)
The following is Bogner & Nicolson's (1991) classification of Araceae as cited in Mayo et al. (1997).

Araceae
Subfamily Gymnostachydoideae
Gymnostachys
Subfamily Pothoideae
Pothos
Pedicellarum
Pothoidium
Subfamily Monsteroideae
Tribe Anadendreae
Anadendrum
Tribe Monstereae
Amydrium
Rhaphidophora
Epipremnum
Scindapsus
Alloschemone
Stenospermation
Rhodospatha
Monstera
Tribe Heteropsideae
Heteropsis
Tribe Spathiphylleae
Spathiphyllum
Holochlamys
Subfamily Calloideae
Calla
Subfamily Lasioideae
Tribe Orontieae
Lysichiton
Symplocarpus
Orontium
Tribe Anthurieae
Anthurium
Tribe Lasieae
Subtribe Dracontiinae
Cyrtosperma
Lasimorpha
Lasia
Anaphyllum
Anaphyllopsis
Podolasia
Urospatha
Dracontioides
Dracontium
Subtribe Pycnospathinae
Pycnospatha
Tribe Zamioculcadeae
Zamioculcas
Gonatopus
Tribe Callopsideae
Callopsis
Tribe Nephthytideae
Pseudohydrosme
Anchomanes
Nephthytis
Cercestis
Tribe Culcasieae
Culcasia
Tribe Montrichardieae
Montrichardia
Subfamily Philodendroideae
Tribe Philodendreae
Subtribe Homalomeninae
Furtadoa
Homalomena
Subtribe Schismatoglottidinae
Schismatoglottis
Piptospatha
Hottarum
Bucephalandra
Phymatarum
Aridarum
Heteroaridarum
Subtribe Philodendrinae
Philodendron
Tribe Anubiadeae
Anubias
Bognera
Tribe Aglaonemateae
Aglaonema
Aglaodorum
Tribe Dieffenbachieae
Dieffenbachia
Tribe Zantedeschieae
Zantedeschia
Tribe Typhonodoreae
Typhonodorum
Tribe Peltandreae
Peltandra
Subfamily Colocasioideae
Tribe Caladieae
Xanthosoma
Chlorospatha
Caladium
Scaphispatha
Jasarum
Tribe Steudnereae
Subtribe Steudnerinae
Steudnera
Remusatia
Gonatanthus
Subtribe Hapalininae
Hapaline
Tribe Protareae
Protarum
Tribe Colocasieae
Colocasia
Alocasia
Tribe Syngonieae
Syngonium
Tribe Ariopsideae
Ariopsis
Subfamily Aroideae
Tribe Stylochaetoneae
Stylochaeton
Tribe Arophyteae
Carlephyton
Colletogyne
Arophyton
Tribe Spathicarpeae
Mangonia
Taccarum
Asterostigma
Gorgonidium
Synandrospadix
Gearum
Spathantheum
Spathicarpa
Tribe Zomicarpeae
Zomicarpa
Filarum
Zomicarpella
Ulearum
Tribe Thomsonieae
Amorphophallus
Pseudodracontium
Tribe Areae
Subtribe Arinae
Arum
Dracunculus
Helicodiceros
Theriophonum
Typhonium
Sauromatum
Eminium
Biarum
Subtribe Arisarinae
Arisarum
Subtribe Arisaematinae
Arisaema
Subtribe Atherurinae
Pinellia
Subtribe Ambrosininae
Ambrosina
Subtribe Cryptocoryninae
Lagenandra
Cryptocoryne
Subfamily Pistioideae
Pistia

Notes

References

Further reading

External links
The Genera of Araceae as listed by the International Aroid Society
Boyce, P. C. & Croat, T. B. (2011 onwards). The Überlist of Araceae, Totals for Published and Estimated Number of Species in Aroid Genera. International Aroid Society.

 List
Araceae
Araceae